James George Hunter (August 19, 1918 – May 28, 1996), known professionally as Jimmy Rowles (sometimes spelled Jimmie Rowles), was an American jazz pianist, vocalist, and composer.  As a bandleader and accompanist, he explored multiple styles including swing and cool jazz.

Music career
Rowles was born in Spokane, Washington, United States, and attended Gonzaga University in that city. After moving to Los Angeles, he joined Lester Young's group in 1942. He also worked with Benny Goodman, Woody Herman, Les Brown, Tommy Dorsey, Tony Bennett, and as a studio musician.

With female singers
Rowles was praised as an accompanist by female singers. He recorded Sarah Vaughan with the Jimmy Rowles Quintet with Sarah Vaughan and accompanied Carmen McRae on her 1972 live album The Great American Songbook. McRae described Rowles as "the guy every girl singer in her right mind would like to work with".

In the 1950s and 1960s, he frequently played behind Billie Holiday and Peggy Lee. In the 1980s, he succeeded Paul Smith as Ella Fitzgerald's accompanist. In late 1956 he performed with Fitzgerald at the Mocambo nightclub in Hollywood, from then on he appeared on several recording sessions with Ella in the 1960s before joining her  in 1981 for nearly three years. Rowles appeared, in 1982, on Fitzgerald's final collaboration with Nelson Riddle, The Best Is Yet to Come. His song "Baby, Don't You Quit Now", written with Johnny Mercer, was recorded on her final album  All That Jazz, released in 1989.

In 1983, Rowles worked with Diana Krall in Los Angeles, shortly after she moved from the Berklee College of Music in Boston. He developed her playing abilities and encouraged her to add singing to her repertoire. In 1994, he accompanied jazz singer Jeri Brown on A Timeless Place, the only album containing only his own compositions.

Compositions
"The Peacocks" is Rowles's best known composition; it has been recorded in 1975 album of the same name with Stan Getz, an subsequently by Gary Foster, John McLaughlin, Esperanza Spalding, Bill Evans, and other artists. Singer Norma Winstone wrote lyrics for the composition and recorded it under the title "A Timeless Place". "The Peacocks" is performed in the Soundtrack of  Bertrand Tavernier's movie Round Midnight.

Rowles' 1958 composition "502 Blues" gained wide exposure from Wayne Shorter's 1966 recording. "502 Blues" was subsequently included in the Real Book, a collection of jazz sheet music widely used by students and professionals when playing jam sessions and casual gigs.

Rowles's piano work was featured prominently on the DePatie-Freleng Enterprises cartoon series The Ant and the Aardvark (1969–1971).

In 1986 the 14th of September was declared “Jimmie Rowles Day” in Los Angeles.

Rowles died in 1996 of cardiac arrest in Burbank, California, aged 77. His daughter, Stacy (September 11, 1955 – October 30, 2009), was a jazz trumpeter, singer, and flugelhornist. His son Gary played guitar with Eric Burdon and Arthur Lee's band Love.

Discography

As leader/coleader
 1954 Rare, But Well Done (Liberty)
 1957 Bill Harris and Friends (Fantasy)
 1958 Let's Get Acquainted with Jazz (for People Who Hate Jazz) (Tampa, reissued by VSOP)
 1958 Weather in a Jazz Vane (Andex, reissued by VSOP)
 1959 Upper Classmen (Interlude)
 1960 Fiorello Uptown, Mary Sunshine Downtown (Signature)
 1962 Kinda Groovy (Capitol)
 1968 Our Delight (VSOP)
 1972 Some Other Spring (Blue Angel)
 1974 Jazz Is a Fleeting Moment (Jazzz)
 1974 The Special Magic of Jimmy Rowles (Halcyon)
 1975 The Peacocks (Columbia) with Stan Getz
 1976 Grandpaws (Choice) (reissued in 2014 as Jam Face Choice CD)
 1976 Paws That Refresh (Choice) (reissued in 2010 as The Chess Players, Choice CD)
 1976 Music's the Only Thing That's on My Mind (Audiophile)
 1977 Heavy Love (Xanadu) with Al Cohn
 1978 Isfahan (Sonet)
 1978 Shade and Light (Ahead)
 1978 Jimmy Rowles Trio on Tour (SIR)
 1978 We Could Make Such Beautiful Music Together (Xanadu)
 1978 Nature Boy (Musica)
 1978 Scarab (Musica)
 1978 Red'n Me (Dreyfus)
 1979  Duets (Cymbol) w Joe Newman
 1979 Tasty! (Concord Jazz)
 1979 My mother's love (PolJazz) 
 1979 Grandpa's Vibrato (Black & Blue 2002)
 1979  Ellington by Rowles (Cymbol)
 1980 Jimmy Rowles in Paris (Columbia)
 1981 Plays Ellington and Billy Strayhorn (Columbia)
 1981 Profile/The music of Henri Renaud  (Columbia)
 1981 Checkmate (Pablo) with Joe Pass
 1983 Peacocks (Stash) with Michael Hashim
 1985 The Jimmy Rowles/Red Mitchell Trio (Contemporary)
 1985 I'm Glad There Is You: Jimmy Rowles, Vol. 2 (Contemporary)
 1988 Looking Back (Delos)
 1988 Sometimes I'm Happy, Sometimes I'm Blue (Orange Blue)
 1989 Plus 2, Plus 3, Plus 4 (JVC)
 1989 Remember When (Master Mix)
 1990 Trio (Capri)
 1994 Lilac Time (Kokopelli)
 1995 A Timeless Place (Justin Time) (w Jeri Brown)

As sideman
With Pepper Adams
 Critics' Choice (World Pacific, 1957)
Urban Dreams (Palo Alto, 1981)
With Louie Bellson
 Skin Deep (Norgran, 1953)
 Music, Romance and Especially Love (Verve, 1957)
With Bob Brookmeyer
 Bob Brookmeyer Plays Bob Brookmeyer and Some Others (Clef, 1955)
 Back Again (Sonet, 1978)
With Hoagy Carmichael
 Hoagy Sings Carmichael (Pacific Jazz, 1956)
With Benny Carter
 Jazz Giant (Contemporary, 1958) – two tracks
Sax ala Carter! (United Artists, 1960)
BBB & Co. (Swingville, 1962) with Ben Webster and Barney Bigard
With Nat King Cole
 L-O-V-E (Capitol, 1965)
With Harry Edison
 Sweets (Clef, 1956)
With Ella Fitzgerald
 Whisper Not (Verve, 1967)
 The Best Is Yet to Come (Pablo, 1982)
 All That Jazz (Pablo, 1989)
With Stan Getz
 Stan Getz and the Cool Sounds (Verve, 1953–55, [1957])
 The Peacocks (Columbia, 1975)
With Jimmy Giuffre
 The Jimmy Giuffre Clarinet (Atlantic, 1956)
 Ad Lib (Verve, 1959)
With Woody Herman
 Songs for Hip Lovers (Verve, 1957)
With Billie Holiday
 Songs for Distingué Lovers (Verve, 1957)
With Barney Kessel
 To Swing or Not to Swing (Contemporary, 1955)
 Music to Listen to Barney Kessel By (Contemporary, 1956)
 Let's Cook! (Contemporary, 1957 [1962])
 Some Like It Hot (Contemporary, 1959)
With Lee Konitz
 Tenorlee (Choice, 1978)
With Julie London
 Julie (Liberty, 1957)
 Julie...At Home (Liberty, 1960)
With Herbie Mann
 Great Ideas of Western Mann (Riverside, 1957)
 The Magic Flute of Herbie Mann (Verve, 1957)
With Carmen McRae
 The Great American Songbook (Atlantic, 1972)
With Gerry Mulligan
 Gerry Mulligan Quartet Volume 1 (2 CD tracks) (Pacific Jazz, 1952)
 Gerry Mulligan Meets Ben Webster (Verve 1959)
With Buddy Rich
 The Wailing Buddy Rich (Norgran, 1955)
With Nelson Riddle
 NAT: An Orchestral Portrait of Nat "King" Cole (Reprise, 1966)
With Pete Rugolo
 The Music from Richard Diamond (EmArcy, 1959)
 The Original Music of Thriller (Time, 1961)
 10 Saxophones and 2 Basses (Mercury, 1961)
With Bud Shank
 Bud Shank - Shorty Rogers - Bill Perkins (Pacific Jazz, 1955)
With Zoot Sims
 Party (Choice, 1976)
 If I'm Lucky (Pablo, 1977)
 For Lady Day (Pablo, 1978 [1991])
 Warm Tenor (Pablo, 1978)
 Passion Flower (Pablo, 1979)
 I Wish I Were Twins (Pablo, 1980)
 The Swinger (Pablo, 1982)
 Suddenly It's Spring (Pablo, 1983)
 Live in San Francisco 1978 (Fog, 2014)
With Sonny Stitt
 Sonny Stitt Plays Jimmy Giuffre Arrangements (Verve, 1959)
With Ben Webster
 Ben Webster at the Renaissance (Contemporary, 1960)
With Buster Williams
 Heartbeat (Muse, 1978)
With Gerald Wilson
 California Soul (Pacific Jazz, 1968)
With Phil Woods and Lew Tabackin
 Phil Woods/Lew Tabackin (Omnisound, 1981)
With Henry Mancini
 Experiment in Terror (RCA Victor, 1962)
 Uniquely Mancini (RCA Victor, 1963)
 Charade (RCA Victor, 1963)
 The Pink Panther (RCA Victor, 1963)
 The Latin Sound of Henry Mancini (RCA Victor, 1965)
 Mancini '67 (RCA Victor, 1967)
 The Party (RCA Victor, 1968)

References

External links

1918 births
1996 deaths
Post-bop pianists
Mainstream jazz pianists
Swing pianists
Cool jazz pianists
West Coast jazz pianists
Ella Fitzgerald
American jazz pianists
American male pianists
Musicians from Spokane, Washington
Xanadu Records artists
Capitol Records artists
Columbia Records artists
Contemporary Records artists
20th-century American pianists
American male jazz musicians
Black & Blue Records artists
Pablo Records artists
20th-century American male musicians